A kunsthalle is a facility that mounts temporary art exhibitions, similar to an art gallery. It is distinct from an art museum by not having a permanent collection.

In the German-speaking regions of Europe, Kunsthallen are often operated by a non-profit  ("art association" or "art society"), and have associated artists, symposia, studios and workshops. They are sometimes called a Kunsthaus.

Origin, spelling and variants
The term kunsthalle is a loanword from the German Kunsthalle, a compound noun formed by combining the two nouns Kunst (art) and Halle (hall).

Like all nouns in German, the word is written with an initial capital letter. In English, it should be written with a lower-case letter (kunsthalle) unless it is the first word of a sentence or part of a title. The plural form Kunsthallen is usually rendered as kunsthalles.

The term is translated as kunsthal in Danish, kunsthal in Dutch, kunstihoone in Estonian, taidehalli in Finnish, kunsthall in Norwegian and konsthall in Swedish.

List of kunsthalles

This list contains the exhibition venues, museums, and art societies that can be considered as kunsthalles.

Austria
 Kunsthaus Graz, Graz
 Kunsthalle Krems (foundation)
 Kunsthalle Wien; see also Museumsquartier, Vienna (municipal)
 KunstHausWien, Vienna

Belgium
 , Ghent
 Kunsthalle Lophem, Loppem
 , Antwerp

Czech Republic 

 Kunsthalle Praha, Prague

Denmark
 Kunsthal Aarhus, Aarhus
 Kunsthal Charlottenborg, Copenhagen
 Nikolaj Kunsthal, (previously known as Kunsthallen Nikolaj), Copenhagen

Estonia
 Tallinn Art Hall, Tallinn (Tallinna Kunstihoone)

Finland
 Kunsthalle Helsinki, Helsinki (Helsingin Taidehalli)
 Kunsthalle Kohta, Helsinki (Kohta Taidehalli)
 Kunsthalle Turku, Turku (Turun Taidehalli)

France
 La Kunsthalle Mulhouse, Alsace
 Château de Montsoreau-Museum of Contemporary Art, Montsoreau

Georgia
 Kunsthalle Tbilisi, Tbilisi

Germany
 Kunsthalle Baden-Baden (state-run)
 Kunsthalle Bielefeld — with permanent collection (municipal)
 Kunsthalle Bonn (German federal)
 Kunsthalle Bremen — with a permanent collection (Kunstverein in Bremen)
 Kunsthalle Bremerhaven (Kunstverein Bremerhaven)
 Kunsthalle Darmstadt (Kunstverein Darmstadt)
 Kunsthalle Düsseldorf (municipal)
 Kunsthalle in Emden — with permanent collection (foundation)
 Kunsthalle Erfurt (municipal/Erfurter Kunstverein)
 Schirn Kunsthalle Frankfurt, Frankfurt (municipal)
 Kunsthalle Hamburg — with permanent collection, see Hamburger Kunsthalle (state-run)
 Kunsthalle Göppingen (municipal/Kunstverein Göppingen)
 Kunsthalle Karlsruhe — with permanent collection (state-run)
 Kunsthalle Fridericianum Kassel, Fridericianum (municipal)
 Kunsthalle zu Kiel — with permanent collection (state-run)
 Kunsthalle Königsberg, now a market in Kaliningrad
 Kunsthalle der Sparkasse Leipzig (foundation)
 Kunsthalle Kunstverein Lingen (Kunstverein Lingen)
 , Mainz
 Kunsthalle Mannheim — with permanent collection (municipal)
 , Münster
 Kunsthalle Nürnberg (municipal)
 Kunsthalle Rostock, Rostock
 Kunsthaus Tacheles, Berlin
 Kunsthalle Tübingen — with permanent collection (municipal/foundation)
 Kunsthalle Wilhelmshaven (municipal/Verein der Kunstfreunde Wilhelmshaven)

Italy
 AnonimaKunsthalle, Varese
 Kunsthalle Bozen, Bolzano
 Kunsthalle Meran, Merano

Netherlands
 , Amersfoort
 Kunsthal Rotterdam, Rotterdam

Norway
 , Bergen
 Kunsthall Oslo, Oslo
 Kunsthall Stavanger, Stavanger
 Kunsthall Trondheim, Trondheim

Poland
 Kunsthalle Breslau/Wrocław
 Kunsthalle Danzig/Gdańsk

Portugal

 Kunsthalle Lissabon, Lisbon, Portugal

Romania
 Kunsthalle Bega/Timișoara

Sweden

Switzerland
 Kunsthalle Arbon
 Kunsthalle Basel (Basler Kunstverein)
 Kunsthalle Bern (Verein der Kunsthalle Bern)
 , Fribourg
 Neue Kunst Halle St. Gallen (foundation)
 Kunsthalle Zürich (municipal/Verein Kunsthalle Zürich)
 Kunsthaus Zürich

United States
 New Museum, New York City, New York
 Aspen Art Museum, Aspen, Colorado
 Institute of Contemporary Art, San Jose, California
 MassArt Art Museum, Boston, Massachusetts
 Kunsthalle Detroit, Michigan
 Contemporary Arts Museum Houston, Texas
 Portsmouth Museum of Art
 Dallas Contemporary Texas
 MOCA Ohio
 Institute of Contemporary Art, Philadelphia, Pennsylvania
 The Renaissance Society at the University of Chicago
 Contemporary Art Museum St. Louis
 Center for Maine Contemporary Art, Rockland, Maine
 Blaffer Art Museum University of Houston, Texas
 Moss Arts Center Virginia Tech, Blacksburg, Virginia

Other countries
 Kunsthalle Budapest, Budapest, Hungary
 Kunsthalle Praha, Prague, Czechia
 , Košice, Slovakia
 Kunsthalle Bratislava, Bratislava, Slovakia

See also
 Art exhibition
 Art gallery

References

Types of art museums and galleries
Lists of art museums and galleries
Kunsthalle
Arts in Germany
German words and phrases